"How Do You Stop" is a song written by Dan Hartman and Charlie Midnight and recorded by James Brown. It appeared on Brown's 1986 album Gravity and was released as a single which charted at number 10 on the US R&B chart. Brown also performs the song on his 1989 album Soul Session Live.

Joni Mitchell covered "How Do You Stop" on her 1994 album Turbulent Indigo in a version featuring vocals by Seal''.

Personnel
James Brown – vocals
Steve Winwood – synthesizers (listed in liner notes as "Lead & Backing Synthesizer")
Dan Hartman – guitars, keyboards, programming and background vocals
T. M. Stevens – bass, background vocals
Ray Marchica – drums
The Uptown Horns (Arno Hecht, Bob Funk, Crispin Cioe, "Hollywood" Paul Litteral) – all brass instruments

References

1987 singles
James Brown songs
Joni Mitchell songs
Songs written by Dan Hartman
Songs written by Charlie Midnight
1986 songs